"Dirty Situation" is a song by Swedish-Congolese singer-songwriter Mohombi featuring vocals from Senegalese American R&B recording artist and songwriter Akon from his debut album MoveMeant. It was released on November 22, 2010 as a Digital download in Sweden. The song was written by RedOne, AJ Junior, Mohombi, Bilal "The Chef" and was produced by RedOne. It peaked to number 54 on the Swedish Singles Chart.

Music video
A music video to accompany the release of "Dirty Situation" was first released onto YouTube on December 9, 2010 at a total length of four minutes and twenty-five seconds.

Track listing

Chart performance

Release history

References

Mohombi songs
Song recordings produced by RedOne
Songs written by RedOne
Songs written by Bilal Hajji
Songs written by AJ Junior
Island Records singles
Songs written by Mohombi
2010 singles
2010 songs
Music videos directed by Dale Resteghini